Jung Ju-mi (born 11 September 1997) is a South Korean biathlete. She competed in the 2018 Winter Olympics.

References

1997 births
Living people
Biathletes at the 2018 Winter Olympics
South Korean female biathletes
Olympic biathletes of South Korea
Biathletes at the 2017 Asian Winter Games
21st-century South Korean women